Randy Napoleon (born 30 May 1978) is an American jazz guitarist, composer, and arranger who tours nationally and internationally. He has also toured with the Freddy Cole Quartet, Benny Green (pianist), the Clayton-Hamilton Jazz Orchestra led by John Clayton, Jeff Clayton, and Jeff Hamilton, Rene Marie, and with Michael Bublé.

He is an associate professor in the College of Music at Michigan State University and has done master classes at universities and music schools throughout the United States and Canada.

Early life
Napoleon was born in Brooklyn, New York, on May 30, 1978. He is the son of Greg Napoleon, a software engineer, and Davi Napoleon, a theater historian and arts journalist, and the grandson of Jack Skurnick, a musicologist and founder of EMS Recordings, and Fay Kleinman, a painter. He has one younger brother, Brian Napoleon. His family moved to Ann Arbor, Michigan, when he was two years old. He studied violin in the Ann Arbor schools before discovering the guitar.

One of Napoleon's formative experiences was in a big band at Ann Arbor Pioneer High School, led by trumpeter Louis Smith. Napoleon also played at the jazz clubs in Ann Arbor and learned from jam sessions at the Bird of Paradise Club. Early opportunities at the Del Rio, a local bar, and at events sponsored by WEMU, a local NPR jazz radio station, helped start his career. When he was in high school, the Ann Arbor News covered his developing talent. Napoleon studied at the University of Michigan School of Music.

Later life and career

Napoleon has led an organ trio which has toured the United States and United Kingdom and which did a concert for BBC radio. The trio appears on Enjoy the Moment and Randy Napoleon: Between Friends, both featuring Jared Gold (organist) and drummer Quincy Davis. Between Friends, a 2006 release from Azica Records, features the trio on half the tracks and a quartet on the other, with Davis, bassist David Wong, and Benny Green on piano. The Randy Napoleon three-horn sextet appears on his 2012 album The Jukebox Crowd. A trio with Rodney Whitaker on bass and Gregory Hutchinson on drums appears on his album for the Detroit Music Factory, Soon.

Napoleon has performed and arranged on all of Freddy Cole's albums since 2009. He has appeared on TV with Cole, on a 2007 PBS special, and on the 2009 Jerry Lewis Muscular Dystrophy Telethon. Napoleon has appeared on Grammy-nominated albums, including Michael Buble: Caught in the Act, Freddy Cole Sings Mr. B, and Freddy Cole: My Mood is You. He arranged music for the two Cole albums.

Napoleon has also toured with Benny Green (2000–2001), Clayton-Hamilton Jazz Orchestra (2003–2004), and Michael Bublé (2004–2007). He has appeared on TV in Japan with CHJO and throughout Europe, Asia and America with Bublé. His U.S. TV appearances with Bublé include David Letterman, Jay Leno, The View, The Today Show, The Ellen DeGeneres Show, Regis and Kelly, Dancing with the Stars, the Radio Music Awards, Entertainment Tonight, and a PBS special, Caught in the Act.

Napoleon has performed with Monty Alexander, Bill Charlap, Michael Dease, Rene Marie, and Rodney Whitaker. He has appeared with cabaret performers Eric Comstock and Barbara Fasano.

Napoleon has performed at Lincoln Center, Hollywood Bowl, The Kennedy Center, Radio City Music Hall, Royal Albert Hall in London, and the Sydney Opera House in Australia.

Napoleon moved to New York City after graduating from the University of Michigan in 1999. He returned to Michigan to teach at the University of Michigan School of Music, Theater and Dance from 2013 to 2014. In the fall of 2014, he accepted an appointment to Michigan State University's College of Music where he is currently a tenured associate professor of jazz. There, he performs with the MSU Professors of jazz, teaches jazz guitar, and leads a student octet. He has taught master classes and clinics at many colleges including Bucknell University, Temple University, Humber College, and Oakland University.

He married Alison Rogers Napoleon in 2010. They have two children, Jack Lawrence (2013) and Juliet Claire (2017). Jack is named for Jack Skurnick, Napoleon's maternal grandfather.

Discography

As leader
 Enjoy the Moment co-leader with Jared Gold (PKO, 2002)
 Between Friends (Azica, 2006)
 Bitter/Sweet co-leader with Eric Comstock (Harbindger, 2010)
 The Jukebox Crowd (Gut String, 2011)
 Soon (Detroit Music Factory, 2016)
 Common Tones (Detroit Music Factory, 2019)
 Rust Belt Roots: Randy Napoleon Plays Wes Montgomery, Grant Green & Kenny Burrell (OA2 Records, 2021)
 Puppets: The Music of Gregg Hill (OA2 Records, 2022)

As sideman

With Freddy Cole, guitarist and arranger
 Era Jazzu (2007)
 The Dreamer in Me (HighNote, 2009)
 Freddy Cole Sings Mr. B (HighNote, 2010)
 Talk to Me (HighNote, 2011)
 This and That (HighNote, 2013)
 Singing the Blues (HighNote, 2014)
 He Was The King (HighNote, 2016) 
 A Freddy Cole Christmas (HighNote, 2018; digital only) 
 My Mood Is You (HighNote, 2018)

With others, guitarist

Selected from over 85 albums

 Michael Buble, Caught in the Act (Reprise, 2005)
 Michael Buble, With Love (Reprise, 2006) 
 Michael Buble, Let It Snow! (Reprise, 2007)
 Michael Buble, A Taste of Bublé (Reprise, 2008) 	
 Etienne Charles, Creole Christmas  (Culture Shock Music ,2015) 
 The Clayton–Hamilton Jazz Orchestra, Live at MCG (MCG, 2005)
 Michael Dease, All These Hands (Posi-Tone, 2016)
 Michael Dease, Give it All You Got (Posi-Tone, 2021) 
 Hilary Gardner, The Great City (Anzic, 2014)
 Jared Gold, Solids & Stripes (Posi-Tone, 2008)
 Melissa Morgan, Until I Met You (Telarc, 2009)
 Rodney Whitaker, Outrospection: The Music of Gregg Hill (Origin, 2021)
 Libby York, Dreamland'' (Origin, 2023)

References

External links
 Official site
 WBGO radio interview
 Michigan State University bio 
 AllMusic bio
 Detroit Music Factory bio
 Studio at Michigan State University
 About early Dreams

1978 births
Living people
Guitarists from New York City
Jazz musicians from New York (state)
University of Michigan School of Music, Theatre & Dance alumni
20th-century American composers
20th-century American guitarists
20th-century American male musicians
21st-century American guitarists
21st-century American male musicians
American jazz composers
American jazz guitarists
American male guitarists
American music arrangers
American session musicians
Bebop guitarists
Hard bop guitarists
Jazz-funk guitarists
Mainstream jazz guitarists
American male jazz composers
Swing guitarists
Clayton-Hamilton Jazz Orchestra members
Musicians from Ann Arbor, Michigan
20th-century jazz composers